Huanxi Town is an urban town in Chaling County, Zhuzhou City, Hunan Province, People's Republic of China.

Cityscape
The town is divided into 17 villages and 1 community: 
Youyi Village
Matang Village
Tuqiao Village
Meilin Village
Hetang Village
Gumu Village
Dongliu Village
Badan Village
Taiying Village
Bailu Village
Feiyan Village
Xijiang Village
Longxia Village
Xiaofen Village
Xiaxiao Village
Yangliu Village
Hanjiang Village
Huanxi Community

References

External links

Divisions of Chaling County